DAMAC Properties is an Emirati property development company, based in Dubai, in the United Arab Emirates. In January 2015, DAMAC Properties was publicly listed on the Dubai Financial Market. The company operates internationally providing residential, commercial and leisure properties and has presence in the UAE, Saudi Arabia, Qatar, Jordan, Lebanon, Iran, Oman, and the United Kingdom.

Finances

In the year 2017, the total revenue recorded by DAMAC properties was AED 7.5 billion. In 2018, DAMAC Properties recorded total revenue of AED 6.1 billion.

History
The company was established on 28 January 2002, and is part of the DAMAC Group, formed in 1982, by Hussain Sajwani, the owner and chairman. In December 2013 DAMAC became the first real estate company from the Middle East to list on the London Stock Exchange (LSE) through a global depository receipts programme. The program raised US$379 million in the form of an IPO. Following an offer to exchange its outstanding Global Depository Receipts (listed on the LSE) for Ordinary Shares (listed on the DFM), DAMAC began trading in Dubai on 12 January 2015. The GDRs were subsequently de-listed in March 2015.

Projects 
The company has released two master developments in Dubai, totaling nearly 100 million square feet between them. DAMAC Hills offers a mix of horizontal and vertical community living set around the championship-standard Trump International Golf Club Dubai and nearly four million square feet of private parkland. Trump International Golf Club Dubai was opened in February 2017 by guests of honour Donald Trump Jr. and Eric Trump. The second development, AKOYA has another golf course by Tiger Woods Design, the Trump World Golf Club Dubai.

In January 2017, DAMAC Properties had awarded more than 370 contracts worth AED 3.5 billion. The contracts included construction, supplier and consultancy services across its portfolio of developments. The company assigned over $1.5 billion to its flagship project Akoya in June 2018.

Safa One and Safa Two 
Safa One and Safa Two are projects by de GRISOGONO. Safa One is situated on the edge of Safa Park, viewing the Dubai Canal while Safa Two is situated opposite to Safa One with views of Dubai Canal, Burj Al Arab and the Palm.

DAMAC Lagoons 
DAMAC Lagoons is a project launched in 2022 as a water-inspired off-plan community located in the Dubailand area.

Cavalli Tower 
Cavalli Tower is located in the Dubai Marina and it consists of 485 units divided into three sections based on luxury level.

DAMAC Hills 
DAMAC Hills is a  golf community development located in Dubailand. The 42-million-square-foot community comprises branded villas, townhouses and apartments, in addition to entertainment and retail facilities, along with a Radisson Hotel. The hotel is located on the Trump International Golf Club Dubai at DAMAC Hills. and has two restaurants, facilities consisting of a gym, spa, kids club and an outdoor swimming pool, and meeting space covering 600m2.

As of December 2019, roughly 4,000 units were delivered at DAMAC Hills, along with a community centre and a 2,000-square-meter-skatepark. DAMAC Hills, built around the 18-hole Trump International Golf Club Dubai, was named "Best Golf Development in the World" at the International Property Awards in London in recent years; and in 2016 received a "highly commended" recognition for Best Golf Development in the Africa and Arabia Property Awards hosted in Dubai.

In November 2020, DAMAC hills launched UAE's first residential wave pool.

DAMAC Heights
DAMAC Heights is an 84-floor tower with 1–5-bedroom apartments located in Dubai Marina. The value of the property is estimated at US$654 million and was handed over in July 2018.

DAMAC Towers by Paramount Hotels & Resorts Dubai
DAMAC Towers by Paramount is a four-tower development by DAMAC Properties in collaboration with Paramount Hotel & Resorts. The project comprises 2000 units with 1200 units across three residential apartment towers and 800 units in the Paramount Hotel tower. The property located in Dubai's Business Bay area has a total built-up area of 4 million square feet and an estimated sales value of $1.35 billion. The towers were handed over in July 2019.

DAMAC Tower Nine Elms London
DAMAC Properties signed a £200 million contract with Lendlease in 2016 to build one of London's tallest residential towers. At 50 floors, AYKON London One, now known as DAMAC Tower Nine Elms London, is located in Nine Elms, on the south bank of the River Thames. The building was designed by Kohn Pedersen Fox Associates with interiors created in partnership Versace Home. The project is valued at $758 million and was topped out in 2019.

Ghalia
In 2019, DAMAC completed the development of named Ghalia, a project with 727 apartments in a Sharia-compliant development, located in the Jumeirah Village Circle in Dubai.

Dubai Business Bay
In 2019, DAMAC Properties announced the launch of its new project, Zada, an accessible luxury offering in Dubai's Business Bay area.

Cavalli residences at Miami 
Damac’s Hussain Sajwani will launch Cavalli residences at $120m plot located at Miami on the site of collapsed Surfside condominium.

DAMAC Hills 2 
In 2014, DAMAC Properties launched, DAMAC Hills 2, a golf community in Dubailand covering 55 million square feet. Comprising clusters of residential villas, apartments, and retail and entertainment facilities.

Hospitality 

DAMAC Hotels & Resorts heads the hospitality element of the company's portfolio, which operates hotel apartment complexes. DAMAC Hotels & Resorts was founded in October 2011.

Its brands include:
 DAMAC Maison Distinction: This project was DAMAC's sixth hotel under their hospitality arm DAMAC Hotels and Resorts
 DAMAC Maison Mall Street
 DAMAC Maison Canal Views
 DAMAC Maison Cour Jardin

The portfolio of hotels provide 24-hour check-in service and other family-friendly services.

DAMAC Maison Dubai Mall Street 
Dubai Mall Street, DAMAC Maison's first serviced hotel apartment project, opened in December 2013. It was designed by German architects Koschany & Zimmer, and located in downtown Dubai opposite to The Dubai Mall.

DAMAC Maison Canal Views 
Canal Views is DAMAC Maison's second hotel property project launched along with Dubai Mall Street in December 2013, also located in downtown Dubai. Canal Views looks over the Business Bay water canal and the Burj Khalifa.

DAMAC Maison Cour Jardin 
Cour Jardin is located in Business Bay, Dubai, and opened in December 2014.

The Distinction 
In September 2017, DAMAC Hotels and Resorts opened The Distinction. The Distinction is located in downtown Dubai.

CSR

DAMAC Properties is known to support the campaigns of His Highness Sheikh Khalifa bin Zayed Al Nahyan, president of the UAE, and the efforts of the UAE Red Crescent, including a donation of AED 2 million to the "clothe a child" campaign, AED one million to the UAE Suqia (Water Aid) programme and a further AED 1 million to help build a high-tech care facility for the Dubai Autism Centre.

In 2014, DAMAC Heights won the "Best International Residential High-rise Architecture" at the International Property Awards.

In 2015, DAMAC Properties donated AED 1 million to the UAE Red Crescent, who was then delivering aid to support refugees in Jordan and Lebanon hit by the "Huda" across the Levant region.

In 2017, DAMAC Charitable Foundation offered sponsorship and support to 1 Million Arab Coders, an initiative by the UAE government to help further education and development in the UAE. Upon its launch, 1.1 million applicants were registered with 22,000 graduates by the end of 2018.

In February 2020, Hussain Sajwani, on behalf of the Hussain-Sajwani-DAMAC Foundation pledged AED3 million towards the construction of the Magdi Yacoub Global Heart Centre in Egypt during the grand finale of the Arab Hope Makers 2020.

In April 2020, the Hussain Sajwani-DAMAC Foundation pledged Dh 1 million to provide food to those affected by COVID-19 pandemic in the UAE. The donation was made to the '100 million meals' campaign.

Awards and recognition

DAMAC properties has won 5 awards in different categories at the Arabian Property Awards 2017, held in Dubai: Best Residential High-rise Development for AYKON City, Best Mixed-use Development for DAMAC Hills, Best Hotel Interior for DAMAC Towers by Paramount Hotels & Resorts, Best Developer Website and Best Hotel Architecture for Paramount Tower Hotel & Residences.

In 2017, Ali Sajwani, son of DAMAC's founder and chairman, Hussain Sajwani, was recognised as a Future Leader at the Arabian Business Achievement Awards organised by Arabian Business.

DAMAC Properties was ranked at number 1 on the Forbes Global 2000 List of Growth Champions, making it the fastest growing company worldwide among the top 2,000 listed by Forbes.

The company's facilities management arm, Luxury Owner Association Management Services LLC (LOAMS) was recognised by The Dubai Land Department (DLD) for its excellence in managing the facilities of numerous properties.

DAMAC Towers by Paramount Hotels & Resorts was awarded the "Residential Project of the Year" award at the CW Awards 2018.

In 2019 DAMAC won the International Business Magazine Awards.

In 2020, DAMAC won the International Business Magazine award for "Most Socially Responsible Real Estate Company UAE".

External links 
 DAMAC Properties

References

Real estate companies established in 2002
Property companies of the United Arab Emirates
Companies based in Dubai
2002 establishments in the United Arab Emirates
Emirati brands